A VMOS transistor is a type of MOSFET (metal–oxide–semiconductor field-effect transistor). VMOS is also used for describing the V-groove shape vertically cut into the substrate material. VMOS is an acronym for "vertical metal oxide semiconductor", or "V-groove MOS".

The "V" shape of the MOSFET's gate allows the device to deliver a higher amount of current from the source  to the drain  of the device. The shape of the depletion region creates a wider channel, allowing more current to flow through it.

During operation in blocking mode, the highest electric field occurs at the N+/p+ junction. The presence of a sharp corner at the bottom of the groove enhances the electric field at the edge of the channel in the depletion region, thus reducing the breakdown voltage of the device. This electric field launches electrons into the gate oxide and consequently, the trapped electrons shift the threshold voltage of the MOSFET. For this reason, the V-groove architecture is no longer used in commercial devices.

The device's use was a power device until more suitable geometries, like the UMOS (or Trench-Gate MOS) were introduced in order to lower the maximum electric field at the top of the V shape and thus leading to higher maximum voltages than in case of the VMOS.

History
The first MOSFET (without a V-groove) was invented by Mohamed Atalla and Dawon Kahng at Bell Labs in 1959. The V-groove construction was pioneered by Jun-ichi Nishizawa in 1969, initially for the static induction transistor (SIT), a type of JFET (junction field-effect transistor).

The VMOS was invented by Hitachi in 1969, when they introduced the first vertical power MOSFET in Japan. T. J. Rodgers, while he was a student at Stanford University, filed a US patent for a VMOS in 1973. Siliconix commercially introduced a VMOS in 1975. The VMOS later developed into what became known as the VDMOS (vertical DMOS). 

In 1978, American Microsystems (AMI) released the S2811. It was the first integrated circuit chip specifically designed as a digital signal processor (DSP), and was fabricated using VMOS, a technology that had previously not been mass-produced.

References

Transistor types
MOSFETs
Japanese inventions